Thermogenesis is the process of heat production in organisms.  It occurs in all warm-blooded animals, and also in a few species of thermogenic plants such as the Eastern skunk cabbage, the Voodoo lily (Sauromatum venosum), and the giant water lilies of the genus Victoria. The lodgepole pine dwarf mistletoe, Arceuthobium americanum,  disperses its seeds explosively through thermogenesis.

Types
Depending on whether or not they are initiated through locomotion and intentional movement of the muscles, thermogenic processes can be classified as one of the following:
 Exercise-associated thermogenesis (EAT)
 Non-exercise activity thermogenesis (NEAT), energy expended for everything that is not sleeping, eating or sports-like exercise.
 Diet-induced thermogenesis (DIT)

Shivering
One method to raise temperature is through shivering. It produces heat because the conversion of the chemical energy of ATP into kinetic energy causes almost all of the energy to show up as heat. Shivering is the process by which the body temperature of hibernating mammals (such as some bats and ground squirrels) is raised as these animals emerge from hibernation.

Non-shivering 

Non-shivering thermogenesis occurs in brown adipose tissue (brown fat) that is present in almost all eutherians (swine being the only exception currently known). Brown adipose tissue has a unique uncoupling protein (thermogenin, also known as uncoupling protein 1) that allows the uncoupling of protons (H+) moving down their mitochondrial gradient from the synthesis of ATP, thus allowing the energy to be dissipated as heat.

In this process, substances such as free fatty acids (derived from triacylglycerols) remove purine (ADP, GDP and others) inhibition of thermogenin, which causes an influx of H+ into the matrix of the mitochondrion and bypasses the ATP synthase channel. This uncouples oxidative phosphorylation, and the energy from the proton motive force is dissipated as heat rather than producing ATP from ADP, which would store chemical energy for the body's use.  Thermogenesis can also be produced by leakage of the sodium-potassium pump and the Ca2+ pump. Thermogenesis is contributed to by futile cycles, such as the simultaneous occurrence of lipogenesis and lipolysis or glycolysis and gluconeogenesis. In a broader context, futile cycles can be influenced by activity/rest cycles such as the Summermatter cycle.

Acetylcholine stimulates muscle to raise metabolic rate.

The low demands of thermogenesis mean that free fatty acids draw, for the most part, on lipolysis as the method of energy production.

A comprehensive list of human and mouse genes regulating cold-induced thermogenesis (CIT) in living animals (in vivo) or tissue samples (ex vivo) has been assembled  and is available in CITGeneDB.

Regulation
Non-shivering thermogenesis is regulated mainly by thyroid hormone and the sympathetic nervous system.  Some hormones, such as norepinephrine and leptin, may stimulate thermogenesis by activating the sympathetic nervous system.  Rising insulin levels after eating may be responsible for diet-induced thermogenesis (thermic effect of food).
Progesterone also increases body temperature.

See also
Thermoregulation

References

External links
 

Physiology
Heat transfer